Archduchess Maria Magdalena of Austria may refer to:
 Archduchess Maria Maddalena of Austria (1589–1631), daughter of Charles II, Archduke of Inner Austria, and Maria Anna of Bavaria, wife of Cosimo II de' Medici, Grand Duke of Tuscany
 Archduchess Maria Magdalena of Austria (1689–1743), daughter of Emperor Leopold I and his third wife Eleonore Magdalene of the Palatinate; never married